TeST Gliders is a manufacturer of ultralight sailplanes and motorgliders based in Brno, Czech Republic.

Aircraft produced
 TeST TST-1 Alpin
 TeST TST-3 Alpin T
 TeST TST-5 Variant
 TeST TST-6 Duo
 TeST TST-7 Junior
 TeST TST-9 Junior
 TeST TST-10 Atlas single seat glider (variants M,MB)
 TeST TST-13 Junior single seat touring motorglider
 TeST TST-14 Bonus 2 seat glider (variants M, MB)
 TeST TST-14J BonusJet 2 seat jet powered self-launching sailplane

References

External links

Aircraft manufacturers of the Czech Republic and Czechoslovakia